The Fat Skier is a mini-LP by Throwing Muses, released on 6 July 1987 on the 4AD label in the UK and licensed to Sire Records in the US. It played at 33 ⅓ RPM on the A-side (the first six tracks) and at 45 RPM on the B-side (a new version of "Soul Soldier", a song which first appeared on their debut album). It reached number two in the Independent Albums Chart in the UK.

Track listing
All songs written by Kristin Hersh except where noted

"Garoux des Larmes" - 2:37
"Pools in Eyes" - 3:20 (Tanya Donelly)
"A Feeling" - 3:09
"Soap and Water" - 2:26
"And a She-Wolf After the War" - 3:31
"You Cage" - 1:41
"Soul Soldier" - 8:48

Personnel
Kristin Hersh - guitars, vocals
Tanya Donelly - guitars, vocals
Leslie Langston - bass
David Narcizo - drums, percussion

Production
Producer: Mark Van Hecke
Engineer: Warren Bruleigh
Mixing: Hideki Sunada for Mission Control
Mastering: Greg Calbi

References

Throwing Muses albums
1987 albums
4AD albums